Alva Blanchard Adams (October 29, 1875 – December 1, 1941) was a Democratic politician who represented Colorado in the United States Senate from 1923 until 1924 and again from 1933 to 1941.

Biography
Adams was born in Del Norte, Colorado and graduated from Phillips Academy in 1893, Yale University in 1896, and Columbia Law School in 1899. He became a county attorney in Pueblo County, Colorado in 1909, a regent of the State University of Colorado in 1911, and Pueblo city attorney in 1911.

During World War I, Adams served as a major in the Judge Advocate General's department in 1918 and 1919. In 1923, he was appointed to fill the vacancy in the United States Senate caused by the death of Samuel D. Nicholson. Adams's appointment made him the first U.S. Senator from Colorado to have been born in the state. Nicholson's death triggered a special election in 1924, but Adams did not run in the special election. Instead, he challenged Republican Senator Lawrence C. Phipps for re-election in the regularly scheduled election held on the same day, losing by a wide margin. In 1932, upon the decision of Senator Charles W. Waterman not to seek re-election, Adams ran to succeed him, with Oscar L. Chapman managing his campaign, and narrowly won the Democratic primary over former state Attorney General John T. Barnett. Waterman died before his term expired, creating a vacancy, but Adams declined to be appointed to the seat and was not a candidate in the special election. Accordingly, state party chairman Walter Walker was appointed to the seat. In the election, Adams narrowly defeated Republican nominee Karl C. Schuyler, but Walker narrowly lost to Schuyler in the special election. Adams was re-elected in 1938 in a landslide. He died in office from a myocardial infarction, also known as a heart attack, in Washington, D.C. in 1941, just days before the Japanese attack on Pearl Harbor.

The Alva B. Adams Tunnel under Rocky Mountain National Park is named for him. The Alva B. Adams tunnel is the key component of the largest transmountain water diversion in the state of Colorado—the Colorado-Big Thompson Project (C-BT). The tunnel is 13.1 miles (21.1 km) long and has a concrete lined diameter of 9.75 feet (2.97 m). The tunnel runs in a straight line under the Continental Divide from west to east and passing under Rocky Mountain National Park. Senator Adams' father, Alva Adams, served as the Governor of the State of Colorado 1887–1889, 1897–1899, and 1905. Senator Adams' uncle, William Herbert "Billy" Adams, served as the Governor of Colorado 1927–1933. His grandfather, John Adams, was a member of the Wisconsin State Assembly and the Wisconsin State Senate.

The Orman-Adams House in Pueblo, where Alva B. Adams lived from 1918 until his death in 1941, is listed on the National Register of Historic Places.

Committee assignments
Alva Adams was first appointed to the U.S. Senate to fill a vacancy during the first session of the 68th Congress. Even though he had been appointed in May 1923, Congress did not convene its first session until December of that year. A first edition of the Official Congressional Directory indicates he did not serve on any committees that session.

After Adams was elected in 1932 to the 73rd Congress, he was appointed to several standing committees. Overall, he served on five standing committees and three select or special committees. Adams also served as chairman of the Committee on Irrigation and Reclamation during the 73rd and 74th Congresses and chaired the Committee on Public Lands and Surveys from the 75th through 77th Congresses.

See also

List of United States senators from Colorado
United States Senate
List of United States Congress members who died in office (1900–49)

References

External links

 Retrieved on 2009-02-19
Alva B. Adams Tunnel

United States Army personnel of World War I
Columbia Law School alumni
Yale University alumni
Phillips Academy alumni
People from Rio Grande County, Colorado
Military personnel from Colorado
Democratic Party United States senators from Colorado
1940 United States vice-presidential candidates
1875 births
1941 deaths
Colorado Democrats
People from Pueblo, Colorado